The Taxation Act 1722 (9 Geo. I, c. 18) was an Act of the Parliament of Great Britain passed in response to the Jacobite risings and the Atterbury Plot. The Taxation Act, with the Oaths Act, is known collectively as the Papists Act 1722.
 
Following the Jacobite rising of 1715, and seeking to curtail the political activity of both Catholics and partisans seeking to restore the Stuart dynasty, the legislature passed multiple bills that varyingly penalized and taxed Catholics, Irish subjects, and other political dissidents. Similar bills passed the parliament throughout the eighteenth century, frequently ratified in waves following similar events of rebellion, most notably the second Jacobite rising of 1745.

The Taxation Act of 1722, also referred to as the "papists tax", was championed by Robert Walpole, 1st Earl of Orford (who is generally regarded as the first Prime Minister of Great Britain). The tax sought to levy £100,000, which was to paid in addition to the double Land Tax already owed by Roman Catholics.The act's sister legislation, the Oaths Act, required a statement from Catholics in support of George I, and further oaths of royal supremacy that compromised the faith of Catholic subjects.

Both acts received royal assent in 1723.

Notes

Great Britain Acts of Parliament 1722
History of Christianity in the United Kingdom